The House of Lords Appointments Commission is an independent advisory non-departmental public body in the United Kingdom. It has two roles:

to recommend at least two people a year for appointment as non-party-political life peers who sit on the crossbenches;
to vet for propriety most other nominations for membership of the House of Lords, including those nominated by the UK political parties, nominations put forward by the Prime Minister for ministerial appointment in the House of Lords, for public service, and nominations in the Honours lists (including Resignation and Dissolution).

The Commission does not vet for propriety the appointments of the Bishops or Archbishops or the 92 hereditary peers who still sit in the House of Lords.

The Commission was established in May 2000 to assist the transitional arrangements for reform of the House of Lords. The role of the Prime Minister in making non-partisan recommendations to the King for creation of life peerages was partially transferred to the Commission, in order to ensure greater transparency in the process. It was also given oversight of all other appointments to the Lords, including partisan nominations.

Members
The Commission has non-partisan members as well as representatives from the House of Lords of the three largest political parties:

 Chair: The Lord Bew (member since 2007; Chair since November 2018)
 Non-party political members:
The Lord Chartes  (member since 2019)
Dame Fionnuala Jay-O'Boyle  (member since 2019)
Harry Mount (member since 2022)
 Members nominated by the three major parties:
Conservatives: The Baroness Browning (member since 2018)
Labour: The Baroness Taylor of Bolton  (member since 2022)
Liberal Democrats: The Baroness Parminter

"People's peers"
The Commission makes recommendations for the appointment of non-partisan life peers. It has established for itself seven criteria upon which to base its decisions, seeking to recommend people with

 a record of significant achievement within their chosen way of life;
 the ability to make an effective and significant contribution to the work of the House of Lords;
 the time available to ensure they can make a contribution;
 some understanding of the constitutional framework, including the place of the House of Lords;
 integrity and independence;
 a commitment to the highest standards of public life; and
 independence from any political party.

The Commission has made recommendations for appointment on 16 occasions since its establishment in 2000, with a total of 67 people being recommended for peerages. All of these individuals went on to be nominated as and created life peers. Upon taking their seats, every one of them joined the crossbenches.

The fact that the type of people considered by the Commission for peers were to be neither aristocratic nor members of the "political class" led some in the British media to describe those it was to appoint as "people's peers". This term has never been a formal classification.

The purpose of the reform was to make the process more open and those making appointments more accountable. Upon the establishment of the Commission, the Prime Minister Tony Blair said it would ensure a House of Lords that was "more representative of our diverse society"; suitable candidates would be sought "in a wider field than up to now".

Following the first set of appointments in April 2001, it was, however, pointed out that those chosen included several knights as well as leading academics and scientists, having much the same establishment background that would have been made peers anyway. The Labour MP Diane Abbott described them as "the metropolitan elite".

Appointments
The people recommended for appointment as life peers by the Commission since its establishment are listed below, by date of recommendation.

26 April 2001
Victor Adebowale CBE
Richard Best OBE
Amir Bhatia OBE
Sir John Browne
Michael Chan MBE
Sir Paul Condon QPM
Ilora Finlay
Susan Greenfield CBE
Sir David Hannay GCMG CH
Valerie Howarth
Lady Howe of Aberavon CBE
Sir Robert May OM AC
Sir Claus Moser KCB CBE
Sir Herman Ouseley
Sir Stewart Sutherland KT

1 May 2004
Sir Alec Broers
Nicola Chapman
Sir Ewen Cameron
Frances D'Souza CMG PC
Elaine Murphy
Lola Young OBE
Diljit Rana MBE

22 March 2005
Dame Rennie Fritchie DBE
General Sir David Ramsbotham GCB CBE

22 July 2005
Dame Ruth Deech DBE
Michael Hastings CBE
Sir Martin Rees OM
Adair Turner
Jo Valentine

3 May 2006
Colin Low CBE
Sir David Rowe-Beddoe
Dame Elizabeth Butler-Sloss GBE
Sir Geoffrey Dear QPM
Kamlesh Patel OBE
Karan Bilimoria CBE
Molly Meacher

15 February 2007
Paul Bew
Dame Jane Campbell DBE
Jean Coussins
Khalid Hameed CBE
Sir John Krebs
Andrew Mawson OBE

18 October 2007
Haleh Afshar OBE
Sir Nicholas Stern

18 April 2008
The Hon. Dame Eliza Manningham-Buller DCB
Sir John Mogg KCMG
Sir Robert Smith

29 September 2008
Susan Campbell CBE
David Pannick QC

13 July 2009
Rabbi Sir Jonathan Sacks
Dame Nuala O'Loan DBE

5 February 2010
Sir Michael Bichard KCB
Dame Tanni Grey-Thompson DBE
Tony Hall CBE
Ajay Kakkar

5 October 2010
Peter Hennessy
Sheila Hollins

5 September 2011
Indarjit Singh CBE
Sir Donald Curry CBE

17 May 2012
Beeban Kidron OBE
Alexander Trees

27 February 2013
Martha Lane Fox CBE
Michael Berkeley CBE

13 October 2015
John Bird MBE
Dame Julia King DBE
Robert Mair CBE
Mary Watkins

8 June 2018
Sir David Anderson KBE QC
Rosie Boycott
Deborah Bull CBE

24 February 2021
Dame Sue Black DBE
Sir Amyas Morse KCB

17 May 2022
Shaista Gohir OBE
Katherine Willis CBE

Objections to PM nominations
In March 2006, the Commission objected to several men proposed for working peerages by Prime Minister Tony Blair, who had loaned large amounts of money to Blair's Labour Party. This led to the "Cash-for-Honours scandal."

In 2020, the Commission objected to the nomination of Peter Cruddas for a peerage by Prime Minister Boris Johnson. Cruddas had donated over £1,000,000 to Johnson's Conservative Party. Johnson nonetheless decided that the appointment should proceed, becoming the first ever prime minister to overrule an advice of the Commission.

See also
 Lords Reform

References

External links
 House of Lords Appointments Commission

Westminster system
House of Lords
Cabinet Office (United Kingdom)
2000 establishments in the United Kingdom